Rich Pahls  (August 7, 1943 – April 27, 2022) was an American politician and educator from the state of Nebraska. He served two terms in the Nebraska Legislature, from 2005 to 2013, representing an Omaha district. He was re-elected to the Nebraska Legislature in 2020.

Pahls graduated from Fort Hays State University in 1966 with a B.A. and in 1967 with an M.A., and from University of Nebraska-Lincoln with an Ed. D in 1979.

State legislature
Pahls was elected to the Legislature in 2004, representing the 31st Nebraska legislative district.  He served as Chairman of the Banking, Commerce and Insurance Committee, and as a member of the Government, and Military and Veterans' Affairs Committee, the Executive Board of the Legislative Council, and the Education Commission of the States.

Pahls was re-elected in 2020.

City council
In May 2013, he was elected to the Omaha City Council. In May 2017, he was re-elected for another four-year term. Pahls resigned from the council on January 5, 2021, in order to serve in the Nebraska Legislature. He died of cancer on April 27, 2022 at the age of 78, while still in office.

References

Sources
 

1943 births
2022 deaths
Fort Hays State University alumni
University of Nebraska–Lincoln alumni
Republican Party Nebraska state senators
Omaha City Council members
21st-century American politicians
People from Jewell County, Kansas